The 1990 Italian Open (known as the Peugeot Italian Open for sponsorship reasons) was a tennis tournament played on outdoor clay courts. It was the 47th edition of the Italian Open, and was part of the ATP Super 9 of the 1990 ATP Tour, and of the Tier I Series of the 1990 WTA Tour. Both the men's and the women's events were held at the Foro Italico in Rome, Italy. The women's tournament was played from May 7 through May 13, 1990, and the men's tournament was played from May 13 through May 21, 1990.

Finals

Men's singles

 Thomas Muster defeated  Andrei Chesnokov 6–1, 6–3, 6–1
It was Thomas Muster's 3rd title of the year and his 8th overall. It was his 1st career Masters title.

Women's singles

 Monica Seles defeated  Martina Navratilova 6–1, 6–1
It was Monica Seles' 4th title of the year and her 5th overall. It was her 1st Tier I title.

Men's doubles

 Sergio Casal /  Emilio Sánchez defeated  Jim Courier /  Martin Davis 7–6, 7–5

Women's doubles

 Helen Kelesi /  Monica Seles defeated  Laura Garrone /  Laura Golarsa 6–3, 6–4

References

 
Peugeot Italian Open
Italian Open (tennis)
Italian Open
May 1990 sports events in Europe